This is a list of events that happened in 2015 in Mexico. The article also lists the most important political leaders during the year at both federal and state levels.

Incumbents

Federal government
President: Enrique Peña Nieto 

Interior Secretary (SEGOB): Miguel Ángel Osorio Chong
Secretary of Foreign Affairs (SRE)
José Antonio Meade, until August 25
Claudia Ruiz Massieu, starting August 27
Communications Secretary (SCT): Gerardo Ruiz Esparza
Education Secretary (SEP)
Emilio Chuayffet, until August 27
Aurelio Nuño Mayer, starting August 27
Secretary of Defense (SEDENA): Salvador Cienfuegos Zepeda
Secretary of Navy (SEMAR): Vidal Francisco Soberón Sanz
Secretary of Labor and Social Welfare (STPS): 
Secretary of Welfare (BIENESTAR)
Rosario Robles, until August 27
José Antonio Meade, starting August 27
Tourism Secretary (SECTUR):
Claudia Ruiz Massieu, until August 27
Enrique de la Madrid Cordero, starting August 27
Secretary of the Environment (SEMARNAT)
Juan José Guerra Abud, until August 27
Rafael Pacchiano Alamán, starting August 27
Secretary of Health (SALUD): Mercedes Juan López
Secretary of Finance and Public Credit, (SHCP): Luis Videgaray Caso

Governors

 Aguascalientes: Carlos Lozano de la Torre 
 Baja California: Francisco Vega de Lamadrid 
 Baja California Sur
Marcos Covarrubias Villaseñor , until September 10
Carlos Mendoza Davis , starting September 10
 Campeche
Fernando Ortega Bernés , until September 15
Alejandro Moreno Cárdenas , starting September 16
 Chiapas: Manuel Velasco Coello 
 Chihuahua: César Horacio Duarte Jáquez 
 Coahuila: Rubén Moreira Valdez, 
 Colima: Mario Anguiano Moreno, 
 Durango: Jorge Herrera Caldera 
 Guanajuato: Miguel Márquez Márquez, 
 Guerrero
Rogelio Ortega Martínez, Interim governor, until October 27
Héctor Astudillo Flores , since October 27
 Hidalgo: Francisco Olvera Ruiz 
 Jalisco: Aristóteles Sandoval 
 State of Mexico: Eruviel Ávila Villegas  
 Michoacán
Salvador Jara Guerrero , Substitute governor until September 30
Silvano Aureoles Conejo , starting October 1
 Morelos: Graco Ramírez .
 Nayarit: Roberto Sandoval Castañeda 
 Nuevo León
Rodrigo Medina de la Cruz , until October 4
Jaime Rodríguez Calderón ("El Bronco"), Independent, starting October 4
 Oaxaca: Gabino Cué Monteagudo 
 Puebla: Rafael Moreno Valle Rosas, 
 Querétaro: José Calzada, 
 Quintana Roo: Roberto Borge Angulo, 
 San Luis Potosí
Fernando Toranzo Fernández , until September 25
Juan Manuel Carreras , since September 26 
 Sinaloa: Mario López Valdez,  
 Sonora
Guillermo Padrés Elías , until September 12
Claudia Pavlovich Arellano , starting September 13
 Tabasco: Arturo Núñez Jiménez 
 Tamaulipas: Egidio Torre Cantú, 	
 Tlaxcala: Mariano González Zarur 
 Veracruz: Javier Duarte de Ochoa 
 Yucatán: Rolando Zapata Bello 
 Zacatecas: Miguel Alonso Reyes 
Head of Government of the Federal District: Miguel Ángel Mancera, Independent

Events

January
 January 7: CENAPRED reported that ash from recent explosions coats the snow on the Popocateptl volcano's upper slopes.
 January 29: An explosion occurred in a maternal hospital in Cuajimalpa, Mexico City, leaving 7 dead and 60 injured.

February 
 February 13: A bus crashes with a freight train in the Mexican state of Nuevo León, killing at least sixteen people and injuring 30.
 February 28: Mexican security forces arrest drug lord Servando Gómez Martínez in Morelia, Michoacán.

March
 March 3: 
During the international tour, in search of foreign investment, President Enrique Peña Nieto, makes various economic, financial and cultural agreements with the Queen Elizabeth II.

April
 April 4: Lunar Eclipse
 April 8: Mexico issues a 100-year bond for 1.5 billion euros or its equivalent to approximately 620 million dollars. No

May
 May 22: Sebastián Lerdo de Tejada Covarrubias dies general director of ISSSTE
 May 27: The SCT opens audits on contracts awarded to OHL
 May 27: Nestora Salgado will be transferred to another prison, that of Tepepan.
 May 28: Murder of coordinator of Panista candidate in the delegation Azcapotzalco.
 May 28: The INE agrees to pay $10,000 to Rigoberta Menchú.
 May 31: Santos champion by defeating the team of Querétaro (5-3).

June
June 5: Legislative elections take place to elect the 63rd Congress of the Union.

November
November 26 – 2015–2016 Zika virus epidemic: The first three cases of Zika fever are reported in Mexico.

Awards

Belisario Domínguez Medal of Honor – Alberto Baillères
Order of the Aztec Eagle
King Felipe VI of Spain
Charles, Prince of Wales
Dilma Rousseff, President of Brazil
National Prize for Arts and Sciences
National Public Administration Prize
Ohtli Award
 Hector Ruiz
 John D. Trasviña
 Valentina Alazraki
 Suzy Castor
 Maria Elena Durazo
 Raúl Grijalva
 Ana Recio Harvey
 José Huizar
 Ray Keck
 Eva Longoria
 Spencer MacCallum 
 Antonio Olmos

Deaths
January 1: Ninón Sevilla, 93, Cuban-born Mexican actress (Aventurera), heart attack.
January 3: Jaime Romero Móran, 22, gymnast, shot.
January 7: Julio Scherer García, 88, journalist (Excélsior and Proceso).
January 25: Demetrio González, 87, Spanish-born Mexican actor (Dos Corazones y un Cielo) and singer, complications from a stroke.
January 27: Rafael Corrales Ayala, 89, politician, MP for Guanajuato (1949–1952, 1979–1982), Governor of Guanajuato (1985–1991).
February 7: Gustavo Couttolenc, 93, Mexican translator and academic.
February 8: Mario Vázquez Raña, businessman (b. 1932)
February 16: Lorena Rojas, 44, actress.
February 19: Rafael Orozco, 92, Mexican footballer (Guadalajara).
February 25: Ariel Camacho, 22, singer, traffic collision.
March 12: Magda Guzmán, 83, actress, heart attack.
March 19: Carlos Mijares Bracho, 84, architect
March 21: Perro Aguayo Jr., 35, professional wrestler (AAA), stroke from vertebral artery dissection.
March 22: Julieta Marín Torres, 71, politician, MP for Puebla (2009–2012), lung cancer.
April 3: Rocío García Gaytán, 55, politician, MP (1997–2000), cancer.
April 10: Raúl Héctor Castro, 98, Mexican-born American politician and diplomat, Governor of Arizona (1975–1977), Ambassador to El Salvador (1964–1968), Bolivia (1968–1969) and Argentina (1977–1980).
April 13: Joselyn Alejandra Niño,  20, suspected assassin, shot.
April 23
Sixto Valencia Burgos, 81, comic artist (Memín Pinguín, MAD).
Guillermo Zúñiga Martínez, 72, academic and politician, Mayor of Xalapa (1988–1991), MP for Veracruz (1994–1997).
April 24: Max Rojas, 74, poet.
May 1: María Elena Velasco, 74, actress, comedian and film producer (La India María), stomach cancer.
May 21: Juan Molinar Horcasitas, 59, Mexican politician, ALS.
June 10: Héctor Pérez Plazola, 81,  politician (PAN).
June 12: Andrés Mora, 60, baseball player (Baltimore Orioles, Cleveland Indians), pneumonia.
June 21: Juan José Estrada, 51, boxer, WBA bantamweight champion (1988–1989), stabbed.
June 26: Gustavo Sainz, 74, writer.
 July 2: Jacobo Zabludovsky, 87, Recognized communicator who directed for more than 20 years the main news on national network; stroke. (b. 1928)
 July 13: Joan Sebastian, 64, Popular singer and composer from Guerrero; bone cancer. (b. 1951)
July 21: Gelsen Gas, 82, artist and filmmaker.
July 31: Rubén Espinosa, 31, photographer and journalist. murdered.
August 15: Manuel Mendívil, 79, equestrian, Olympic medalist (1980).
August 16: Jacob Bekenstein, 68, Mexican-born Israeli-American theoretical physicist.
August 23
Ricardo García Sainz, 85, administrator and politician, Federal deputy (1997–2000).
Eugenio Méndez Docurro, 92, politician and engineer, Secretary of Communications and Transportation (1970–1976).
September 7: Sigifredo Nájera Talamantes, drug cartel leader (Los Zetas), heart attack.
September 17: Eraclio Zepeda, 78, author and politician.
September 19: Enrique Ballesté, 68, theater director.
September 25: Hugo Gutiérrez Vega, 81, poet, diplomat and academic, Ambassador to Greece (1987–1994).
October 9: Blanca Magrassi Scagno, 92, women's rights activist.
October 11: Dominga Velasco, 114, Mexican-born American supercentenarian, oldest-ever verified Mexican-born person.
October 14: José Luis García, 91, baseball player and manager (Tigres de Quintana Roo).
October 22: Tomás Torres Mercado, 54, politician, member of the Senate (20062012), plane crash.
November 6: José Ángel Espinoza, 96, singer, composer and actor.
November 12: José Refugio Esparza Reyes, 94, politician, Governor of Aguascalientes (1974–1980).
November 21: Germán Robles, 86, Spanish-Mexican actor.
December 1: Xavier Olea Muñoz, 92, diplomat, lawyer and politician; Governor of Guerrero (1975)
December 4: Ricardo Guízar Díaz, 82, Roman Catholic prelate, Archbishop of Tlalnepantla (1996–2009).
December 16: Lizmark, 64, professional wrestler, respiratory failure.
December 24: Romeo Anaya, 69, boxer, WBA Bantamweight Champion (1973).

See also

 List of Mexican films of 2015

References

External links 

 
Mexico
Years of the 21st century in Mexico
Mexico
2010s in Mexico